Material girl or material girls may refer to:

Arts and entertainment
 "Material Girl", a song by Madonna
 Material Girl (TV series), a 2010 UK TV series
 Material Girls, a 2006 US film
 Material Girls, a 2021 book by Kathleen Stock
 Material Girl, a song by Saucy Santana

Other uses
 A female person (girl or woman) who is materialistic
 A sobriquet for the American singer Madonna, or her Material Girl Collection clothing line designed with her daughter Lourdes Ciccone Leon